Dominez Burnett (born October 28, 1992) is an American professional basketball player from Flint, Michigan. Burnett last played for MZT Skopje. In 2016, Burnett was named the Bevo Francis National Small College Basketball Player of the Year. Prior to that, in 2015, Burnett was named the NABC NAIA Division II Player of the Year, while playing for Davenport University.

Professional career
Burnett started his professional basketball career in 2016 with BK Pardubice and as a rookie lead his professional team in scoring. As a rookie, Burnett was the fifth leading scorer in one of the three high ranking leagues in European basketball outside of the NBA, the FIBA Europe Cup. Burnett shot 58% from the field as a rookie in FIBA and as a result he resigned with BK Pardubice for the 2017–18 season.

On January 14, 2018, after leading the Czech Basketball League in scoring, Burnett was bought out his contract and joined BK Ventspils of the Latvian Basketball League where he won a Latvian Championship in the 2017–18 season. Burnett won the Italian Serie A2 cup and the Italian Serie A2 Championship with Universo Treviso on June 17, 2019.

On August 7, 2019, he has signed with Tsmoki-Minsk of the VTB United League.

References

Living people
1992 births
American expatriate basketball people in Belarus
American expatriate basketball people in the Czech Republic
American expatriate basketball people in Italy
American expatriate basketball people in Latvia
American men's basketball players
Basketball players from Flint, Michigan
BC Tsmoki-Minsk players
BK Pardubice players
BK Ventspils players
Davenport Panthers men's basketball players
Point guards
Shooting guards
Universo Treviso Basket players